Tha Chomphu railway station is a railway station located in Tha Pladuk Subdistrict, Mae Tha District, Lamphun. The station is the railway station closest to Tha Chomphu Bridge, or also known as the "White Bridge" as it was built of white concrete.

Train services 
 Local 407/408 Nakhon Sawan-Chiang Mai-Nakhon Sawan

References 
 
 

Railway stations in Thailand